The Lonely Hearts are an Americana and rock band formed in 2003 in Nashville, Tennessee by brothers Will and Josiah Holland. They have released one full-length album, Paper Tapes.

History
The Lonely Hearts started as a four-piece while living in Nashville. The Holland brothers are the only remaining original members. They released Paper Tapes through Tooth & Nail on March 7, 2006, but are currently independent.  Recently they have recorded demos with Ethan Luck for a new album at Rebel Waltz Recording Co. in Franklin and East Nashville, Tennessee.  Prior to The Lonely Hearts, they were called Holland, and released an album called Photographs and Tidal Waves on Tooth and Nail. Before that they were called Somerset.

Members
 Will Morgan Holland - vocals, guitar
 Josiah Holland - vocals, keyboards, accordion
 Jeremy Branon  - bass
 Joey Sanchez - drums
 Dave Coleman - vocals, guitar

Discography

Albums
Photographs & Tidalwaves (2003), Tooth & Nail - as Holland
 Paper Tapes (March 7, 2006), Tooth & Nail
 Born in the Dark (2008), independent release

References

External links
 The Lonely Hearts official myspace page
 Tooth & Nail Records official Lonely Hearts Bio
 [ Lonely Hearts at Allmusic.com]

Musical groups from Nashville, Tennessee